Ganpat Iswarbhai Patel (born 1945 or 1946) also known as Pat Patel is an Indian-American businessman and philanthropist. He is the founder of Cherokee International, and was president and CEO before retiring in 2004.

Patel is the President and Patron-in-Chief of Ganpat University located in the Mehsana district of North Gujarat.

Patel was honored with the Padma Shri award in the literature and education category.

Early life and education
Ganpat Patel is the son of Iswarbhai Patel and Menaben Patel. He was born in the village of Bhunav in Mehsana, Gujarat in 1945 or 1946. He received a bachelor of science degree in electrical engineering from California State Polytechnic University, in Pomona in 1969 and a master's degree, also in electrical engineering, from UCLA in 1973.

Career
Patel got his first job in an aviation industry company Lockheed Martin but he lost this job soon due to recession in aviation sector. He was lucky to get the immediate job offer from Abbott Laboratories in Culver City of Los Angeles in 1971. There after he also got an opportunity in Burroughs Computer and he acquired many useful skills which gave a great push to the tenets of entrepreneurship in him. In 1978, Shri Patel, with the help of his wife, founded Cherokee International, Inc., a power supply company. Cherokee secured relationships with businesses like IBM, CISCO, Motorola, and Hewlett Packard and opened manufacturing facilities in the United States, India, Belgium, and Mexico. Patel retired from his professional career in 2004.

Personal life

His wife, Manju Patel, is a social worker and philanthropic. She runs a sainik school for girls on her name Smt M.G. Patel Sainik School for Girls in North Gujarat, India and making sure that 400+ girls get their schooling education every year through this military school. She does philanthropic work with the help of her husband Ganpat Patel and her family.

Supported by his wife Smt Manjuben and motivated by his three daughters, Rita, Anita and Asha as well as his seven grandchildren, Patel has started a “सेवा यज्ञ” social upliftment through education and established various institutions in India which can impart quality learning to Indian students.

Awards and honors

References

External links
 

1940s births
Living people
Recipients of the Padma Shri in literature & education
Gujarati people
Indian billionaires
Businesspeople from Los Angeles
Electric power
University and college founders
Indian electrical engineers
Indian philanthropists
California State Polytechnic University, Pomona alumni